Potters Bar railway station serves the town of Potters Bar in Hertfordshire, England.

History
Potter's Bar was one of the original stations, opening with the line on 7 August 1850.

On 1 May 1923, the station was renamed Potter's Bar and South Mimms; on 3 May 1971 it reverted to its original name of Potter's Bar.

The current station building, in a "post modern" style, is the third on this site. It replaced a 1955 structure designed by James Wyatt of the Eastern Region Architect's Department (Chief Architect H Powell). Pevsner described the 1955 station as "The first of the Eastern Region's good modern stations, the style much lighter in touch than in the stations of the 1960s (cf Broxbourne). Neat brick clerestory-lit booking hall".

The platform canopies were also constructed in 1955, using what was then an innovative technique of pre-stressed concrete. As the concrete set it unexpectedly curved up at either end of the long, thin canopies, unintentionally creating the "willow" look.

Facilities
The station has a ticket office which is staffed for most of the day.

The station is on two levels. On the lower level are ticket machines in the booking hall and near the entrance to the car park, a photo booth, cash machine, two ticket counters and a cafe. Ramped access to the platforms is controlled by automatic ticket barriers.

On the upper level, canopies run most of the length of both platforms. Each island platform has a help-point. Platforms 1 & 2 have toilets refreshment kiosk, and customer information office. Platforms 3 & 4 are home to staff facilities, including a mess room and station manager's office.

Platforms 2 & 3 are used by express services, and platforms 1 & 4 on the slow lines are used by local services.

Services

Current Services
Services at Potters Bar are operated by Thameslink and Great Northern using  and  EMUs.

The typical off-peak service in trains per hour is:

During the peak hours, the service to Letchworth Garden City is extended to Cambridge and the service between Moorgate and Welwyn Garden City is increased to 4 tph.

The station is also served by a small number of Thameslink operated services between Welwyn Garden City and  via the Thameslink Core.

Thameslink Programme

In September 2016, Govia Thameslink Railway released a consultation for their May 2018 timetables, following the completion of the Thameslink Programme.

The peak hour Welwyn Garden City to London King's Cross were also to be transferred to Thameslink and extended to  via .

In May 2018, the local Great Northern services were increased to 4 tph as planned, although they have subsequently been reduced to 2 tph due to the COVID-19 pandemic. The Cambridge to London services were also transferred to Thameslink but were not extended to Maidstone East and this extension has now been postponed to an unknown date.

The Welwyn Garden City to London services were transferred to Thameslink in May 2018 as planned and were subsequently extended to Sevenoaks in May 2022.

Connections
The station is served by London Buses routes 298 and 313, Metroline routes 242 and PB1, Sullivan Buses routes 84 and 398 and Uno route 610.

Accidents and incidents

The station has been the site of two major train crashes, one in 1946 and one in 2002.

 On 10 February 1946, a local passenger train travelling towards  crashed into the barriers at Potters Bar Station causing debris to foul the fast lines. The debris was then hit by two express trains on the fast lines causing two deaths and 17 injuries.
 On 10 May 2002, a northbound express train derailed whilst passing through the station resulting in seven deaths and 76 injuries.

Oyster card ticketing

As of 30/08/2019 Oyster cards are accepted on journeys to Potters Bar. The train operating company, Govia, agreed to extend London Zonal Fares to include Potters Bar by September 2015 when they won the Great Northern franchise. More recently Transport for London indicated that Welwyn Garden City and Potters Bar are two of the top four priority stations for the extension of London Zonal Fares.  
The station came under Transport for London's Oystercard fare system during summer 2019.

References

External links

Railway stations in Hertfordshire
DfT Category C2 stations
Former Great Northern Railway stations
Railway stations in Great Britain opened in 1850
Railway stations served by Govia Thameslink Railway
Potters Bar